Phobetus is a genus of May beetles and junebugs in the family Scarabaeidae. There are about 11 described species in Phobetus.

Species
These 11 species belong to the genus Phobetus:
 Phobetus chearyi Hardy, 1973
 Phobetus ciliatus Barrett, 1935
 Phobetus comatus LeConte, 1856 (Robinson's rain scarab)
 Phobetus desertus Blom & Clark, 1984
 Phobetus humeralis Cazier, 1937
 Phobetus mojavus Barrett, 1933
 Phobetus palpalis Saylor, 1936
 Phobetus panamintensis Hardy, 1978
 Phobetus saylori Cazier, 1937
 Phobetus sleeperi Hardy, 1978
 Phobetus testaceus LeConte, 1861

References

Further reading

 
 
 
 
 

Melolonthinae
Articles created by Qbugbot